HR 4796 is a binary star system in the southern constellation of Centaurus. The two components of this system have an angular separation of 7.7 arcseconds, which, at their estimated distance, is equivalent to a projected separation of about 560 Astronomical Units (AU), or 560 times the separation of the Earth from the Sun. The star and its ring resemble an eye, and it is sometimes known by the nickname "Sauron's Eye".

Components
This is a young system with an estimated age of about 8 million years.  The primary member A has a stellar classification of A0 V, while its smaller companion B is a red dwarf with a classification of M2.5 V. The luminosity class of 'V' indicates that both stars belong to the main sequence and are generating energy through the thermonuclear fusion of hydrogen at their cores. The primary is emitting this energy from its outer envelope at an effective temperature of about 9,378 K, which gives it the white hue characteristic of A-type stars. It has a radius about 168% of the radius of the Sun and 218% of the Sun's mass. By comparison, the secondary has only 30% of a solar mass. The abundance of elements other than hydrogen or helium, what astronomers term the star's metallicity, is similar to the proportion in the Sun.

Debris disk
In 1991, the primary was found to have an excess of infrared emission, implying that it has a circumstellar debris disk. Observations using the Near-Infrared Multi-Object Spectrometer aboard the Hubble Space Telescope in 2007 indicated that the dust had a reddish spectrum similar to that of tholins. The disk was resolved with the Hubble Space Telescope in 2009, confirming that it exists. Based on these images, the disk has a radius of 75 AU and a width of less than 18.5 AU. It may have some asymmetries and the center appears to be slightly offset from the star. The dust in the disk is likely the result of collisions between larger particles. In 2011, observations of the ring offset by the Subaru Telescope implies that one or more planets would likely exist within gaps tugging at its dust grains. With a new image in 2014, the configuration and alignment of the dust ring and HR4796A has been nicknamed "Eye of Sauron".

In 2017 a group using NASA/IRTF and Spitzer infrared spectroscopy of the infrared excess determined that the bright narrow ring is made up of very red devolatilzed cometary material, and that a second faint, hot diffuse dust component likely due to inspiralling material escaping from the ring was present close to the star and evaporating. The discovery of a complex dust structure about 1,600 AU across, enveloping HR 4796A, was announced in March 2018. The structure is believed to have been formed by the pressure of starlight from HR 4796A expelling dust from the debris disk far into space. The structure is much more extended in one direction than the other, possibly due to either the motion of HR 4796A through the interstellar medium, or the gravitational influence of HR 4796B.

Kinematics
The space velocity of HR 4796 in the Galactic coordinate system is  = . This trajectory and the location of the system suggests that it may be a member of the TW Hydrae association of stars that share a common origin. A low-mass member of this association, identified as 2MASS J12354893−3950245, may be a tertiary component of the HR 4796 system. It has a proper motion matching HR 4796, suggesting it is gravitationally bound to the other two stars, and is separated from the pair by a distance of about 13,500 AU.

See also
 Vega

References

External links
 
 

A-type main-sequence stars
M-type main-sequence stars
Centaurus (constellation)
109573
061498
4796
Circumstellar disks
Binary stars
Durchmusterung objects